Gorzków  (Horzhkiv) is a village in Krasnystaw County, Lublin Voivodeship, in eastern Poland. It is the seat of the gmina (administrative district) called Gmina Gorzków.

During the Holocaust, 500 to 800 Jews from the village were murdered.

The village has a current population of 264.

References

Villages in Krasnystaw County
Lublin Governorate